The 1972 Brisbane Rugby League season was the 64th season of the Brisbane Rugby League premiership. Eight teams from across Brisbane competed for the premiership, which culminated in Eastern Suburbs defeating Fortitude Valley 16–15 in the grand final, winning their first premiership since 1950.

Ladder

Finals 

Source:

References

1972 in rugby league
1972 in Australian rugby league
Rugby league in Brisbane